Lelan is a given name and surname. Notable people with the name include:

 Josh Lelan (born 1994), English-born Kenyan football player
 Lelan Rogers (1928–2002), American record producer and record company executive
 Lelan Sillin, Jr. (1918–1997), nuclear power pioneer

See also
 Leeland, given name
 Leland § People